Volutoconus coniformis, common name : the Cone-shaped Volute, is a species of sea snail, a marine gastropod mollusk in the family Volutidae, the volutes.

Description
The size of an adult shell varies between 50 mm and 75 mm.

Distribution
This species is found in the Coral Sea along Northwest Australia.

References

 Bail, P & Poppe, G. T. 2001. A conchological iconography: a taxonomic introduction of the recent Volutidae. Hackenheim-Conchbook, 30 pp, 5 pl.

External links
 Gastropods.com : Volutoconus coniformis; accessed : 3 April 2011

Volutidae
Gastropods described in 1871